The non-marine mollusks of Hong Kong are a part of the molluscan fauna of Hong Kong. A number of species of non-marine mollusks are found in the wild in Hong Kong.

Freshwater gastropods 

Thiaridae
 Brotia hainanensis (Brot, 1872)

Land gastropods 

Cyclophoridae
 Cyclophorus volvulus (O. F. Müller, 1774)

Rhytididae
 Macrocycloides crenulata Yen, 1939

Streptaxidae
 Haploptychius sinensis (Gould, 1858)

Ariophantidae
 Megaustenia imperator imperator (Gould, 1858)

Camaenidae
 Moellendorffia eastlakeana (Möllendorff, 1882)

See also
 Environment of Hong Kong
 Conservation in Hong Kong
 List of marine molluscs of Hong Kong

Lists of molluscs of surrounding countries:
 List of non-marine molluscs of China
 List of non-marine molluscs of Taiwan
 List of non-marine molluscs of the Philippines

References

Further reading 
 Dudgeon D. (1989). "Ecological strategies of Hong Kong Thiaridae (Gastropoda: Prosobranchia)". Malacological Review 22: 39-53.

Molluscs, Hong Kong
Molluscs
Hong Kong
Hong Kong